Richards Historic District is a national historic district located in Greenwood, Sussex County, Delaware.  The district includes 21 contributing buildings and 1 contributing site encompassing  portions of three separate farms with three groupings of farm buildings. The farms are Poplar Level Farm, Locust Grove Farm, and Middle Space Farm.  The three houses in the district were constructed by various members of the Richards family between 1758 and 1868. The earliest structure in the district is Poplar Level, the main section of which was built about 1758 by John Richards.

It was added to the National Register of Historic Places in 1983.

References

Farms on the National Register of Historic Places in Delaware
Historic districts on the National Register of Historic Places in Delaware
Historic districts in Sussex County, Delaware
National Register of Historic Places in Sussex County, Delaware